The Embassy of the Philippines in London is the diplomatic mission of the Philippines in the United Kingdom. It is located on a cul-de-sac near Trafalgar Square. The Philippines also maintains a Trade Section at 1a Cumberland House, Kensington Court, South Kensington.

As of 2012, the embassy is accredited to the Republic of Ireland, following the closure of the Philippine Embassy in Dublin.

Gallery

References

External links
Official site

Philippines
London
Philippines–United Kingdom relations
Buildings and structures in the City of Westminster